Yasuhide is a masculine Japanese given name.

Possible writings
Yasuhide can be written using different combinations of kanji characters. Here are some examples:

康英, "healthy, hero"
康秀, "healthy, excellence"
康栄, "healthy, prosperity"
靖英, "peaceful, hero"
靖秀, "peaceful, excellence"
靖栄, "peaceful, prosperity"
靖日出, "peaceful, sunrise"
安英, "tranquil, hero"
安秀, "tranquil, excellence"
安栄, "tranquil, prosperity"
保英, "preserve, hero"
保秀, "preserve, excellence"
保栄, "preserve, prosperity"
泰英, "peaceful, hero"
泰秀, "peaceful, excellence"
泰栄, "peaceful, prosperity"
易英, "divination, hero"
易秀, "divination, excellence"
恭英, "respectful, hero"

The name can also be written in hiragana やすひで or katakana ヤヤスヒデ.

Notable people with the name
, an early Heian period poet
, a Japanese football player
, a Japanese composer
, a Japanese artist
, a Japanese daimyō
, a Japanese politician
Yasuhide Yamana (山名 靖英, born 1944), Japanese politician

Japanese masculine given names